Baison Manikon (born 7 November 2001) is a Thai boxer. She competed in the women's welterweight event at the 2020 Summer Olympics.

Biography
Baison (nicknamed: cream) was born in the boxer family. As a child, she was debilitated from asthma and allergy illnesses, for this reason, she turned to boxing starting with Muay Thai with father as a trainer. When she was 10, she began to be a female amateur Muay Thai boxer patrolling various tournaments in the region. With versatility beyond age, therefore she was given the opportunity to compete in "Thai Fight".

Later, she was persuaded to switch to amateur boxing from Somchai Poonsawat a technical director of Thailand Boxing Association, who has followed her in many bouts. The 2020 Summer Olympics was her first major tournament.

References

External links
 

2001 births
Living people
Baison Manikon
Baison Manikon
Boxers at the 2020 Summer Olympics
Baison Manikon
Baison Manikon